WXRF (1590 AM) is a radio station licensed to serve Guayama, Puerto Rico. The station is part of the Borinquen Radio News Network and is owned and operated by Grupo AM Puerto Rico, and features programming from CNN en Español. It airs a Spanish-language News/Talk format. The station is shared with translator station W280FS 103.9 FM also in Guayama.

Call letters
The station was assigned the WGYA call letters by the Federal Communications Commission (FCC) on March 24, 2014. It changed back to its original WXRF call sign on August 2, 2017.

Translator stations

References

External links
FCC History Cards for WXRF

News and talk radio stations in Puerto Rico
Radio stations established in 1948
1948 establishments in Puerto Rico
Guayama, Puerto Rico